Henry Mitchell McCullough (September 24, 1858 – February 27, 1930) was a politician and lawyer from Maryland. He was a member of the Maryland Senate from 1902 to 1906.

Early life
Henry Mitchell McCullough was born on September 24, 1858, in Elkton, Maryland, to James T. McCullough. He attended local schools and the Elkton Academy. He graduated from Princeton University in June 1879. After moving back to Elton, McCullough read law and was admitted to the bar in 1881.

Career
McCullough practiced law in Elkton.

McCullough was a Republican. In 1901, McCullough was elected to the Maryland Senate, serving from 1902 to 1906. He served as a Maryland elector in the 1896 United States presidential election.

Personal life
McCullough married Carrie G. Brady of Chesapeake City, Maryland, on February 25, 1896. McCullough was a Presbyterian.

McCullough died on February 27, 1930, at his home in Elkton. He was buried at Bethel Cemetery in Chesapeake City.

References

1858 births
1930 deaths
People from Elkton, Maryland
Princeton University alumni
Republican Party Maryland state senators
Maryland lawyers
Presbyterians from Maryland